María López de Gurrea (fl. 1492) was a Spanish noblewoman.  

She was known in Renaissance Spain for her great learning and considered a scholar in Greek and Latin.

References

15th-century Spanish women
Spanish Renaissance people